This is a list of 1075 species in the genus Chlaenius, vivid metallic ground beetles.

Chlaenius species

 Subgenus Achlaenius Mandl, 1992
 Chlaenius amplipennis Chaudoir, 1876
 Chlaenius athleta Kryzhanovskij, 1976
 Chlaenius dalibaiensis Kirschenhofer, 2008
 Chlaenius grosseri Kirschenhofer, 2018
 Chlaenius kurosawai Kasahara, 1986
 Chlaenius leytensis Kirschenhofer, 2008
 Chlaenius micans (Fabricius, 1792)
 Chlaenius ocreatus Bates, 1873
 Chlaenius rotundus Andrewes, 1920
 Chlaenius sericimicans Chaudoir, 1876
 Chlaenius variicornis A.Morawitz, 1863
 Chlaenius vietnamensis Kirschenhofer, 2008
 Subgenus Agostenus Fischer von Waldheim, 1829
 Chlaenius alternatus G.Horn, 1871
 Chlaenius alutaceus Gebler, 1830
 Chlaenius caeruleicollis Chaudoir, 1876
 Chlaenius caurinus (G.Horn, 1885)
 Chlaenius costulatus (Motschulsky, 1859)
 Chlaenius harpalinus Eschscholtz, 1833
 Chlaenius interruptus G.Horn, 1876
 Chlaenius lithophilus Say, 1823
 Chlaenius niger Randall, 1838
 Chlaenius quadrisulcatus (Paykull, 1790)
 Chlaenius sulcicollis (Paykull, 1798)
 Subgenus Aleptocerus LaFerté-Sénectère, 1851
 Chlaenius quadripustulatus Dejean, 1831
 Subgenus Amblygenius LaFerté-Sénectère, 1851
 Chlaenius abacoides Alluaud, 1933
 Chlaenius aberanus Sternberg, 1908
 Chlaenius afganus Jedlicka, 1956
 Chlaenius africanicus Kirschenhofer, 2009
 Chlaenius allacteus Alluaud, 1919
 Chlaenius allardi (Basilewsky, 1967)
 Chlaenius alluaudianus Jedlicka, 1957
 Chlaenius amplicollis (Basilewsky, 1953)
 Chlaenius andamanensis Andrewes, 1920
 Chlaenius anthraceus Alluaud, 1918
 Chlaenius apollo Andrewes, 1919
 Chlaenius arnoldi Basilewsky, 1949
 Chlaenius aruwimius Bates, 1890
 Chlaenius atripes Chaudoir, 1876
 Chlaenius aurifex Basilewsky, 1949
 Chlaenius baliensis Kirschenhofer, 2011
 Chlaenius bangkokensis Kirschenhofer, 2004
 Chlaenius bengalensis Chaudoir, 1856
 Chlaenius borellyi Burgeon, 1941
 Chlaenius braminus Chaudoir, 1876
 Chlaenius brunnescens Kirschenhofer, 2009
 Chlaenius caffer Boheman, 1848
 Chlaenius cambodiensis Bates, 1889
 Chlaenius cebuensis Kirschenhofer, 2008
 Chlaenius cecrops Kirschenhofer, 2009
 Chlaenius chagga Alluaud, 1927
 Chlaenius championi Andrewes, 1923
 Chlaenius chengduensis Kirschenhofer, 2004
 Chlaenius chiangmaiensis Kirschenhofer, 2008
 Chlaenius chlorodius Dejean, 1826
 Chlaenius columbinus Dejean, 1831
 Chlaenius comes Péringuey, 1896
 Chlaenius congoanus Alluaud, 1934
 Chlaenius consors Péringuey, 1896
 Chlaenius convexus Fairmaire, 1886
 Chlaenius corbetti Andrewes, 1919
 Chlaenius costipennis Boheman, 1848
 Chlaenius cupreolineatus Chaudoir, 1876
 Chlaenius cupreolus Fairmaire, 1901
 Chlaenius cupreopurpureus Kirschenhofer, 2009
 Chlaenius cuprithorax Quedenfeldt, 1883
 Chlaenius curtulus Kirschenhofer, 2004
 Chlaenius cyanipennis Boheman, 1848
 Chlaenius cyanostolus Andrewes, 1924
 Chlaenius damazinensis Kirschenhofer, 2015
 Chlaenius delicatus Bates, 1892
 Chlaenius diabolicus (Basilewsky, 1961)
 Chlaenius difficilis Sternberg, 1908
 Chlaenius dilatatus (Motschulsky, 1864)
 Chlaenius dimidiatus Chaudoir, 1842
 Chlaenius elgonensis Alluaud, 1939
 Chlaenius elongatulus Kirschenhofer, 2009
 Chlaenius episcopalis Dejean, 1831
 Chlaenius fairmairei Murray, 1858
 Chlaenius fletcheri Andrewes, 1919
 Chlaenius freyellus Jedlicka, 1959
 Chlaenius gabonensis Kirschenhofer, 2009
 Chlaenius gambelaensis Kirschenhofer, 2011
 Chlaenius gikondo Kirschenhofer, 2009
 Chlaenius glabratus Dejean, 1831
 Chlaenius grootfonteinensis Kirschenhofer, 2011
 Chlaenius grundmanni (Basilewsky, 1956)
 Chlaenius haeckeli Kirschenhofer, 2014
 Chlaenius heidenfelderi Kirschenhofer, 2008
 Chlaenius henryi Andrewes, 1919
 Chlaenius hypocrita Péringuey, 1896
 Chlaenius inaequalis Fairmaire, 1901
 Chlaenius jactus Kirschenhofer, 2004
 Chlaenius jeanneli Basilewsky, 1949
 Chlaenius kabompo Kirschenhofer, 2011
 Chlaenius kafakumbae Burgeon, 1935
 Chlaenius kalimantanensis (Kirschenhofer, 2003)
 Chlaenius kapangae Burgeon, 1935
 Chlaenius kathmanduensis Kirschenhofer, 2016
 Chlaenius kerkvoordeae Burgeon, 1935
 Chlaenius kotys Kirschenhofer, 2004
 Chlaenius lacunosus Andrewes, 1920
 Chlaenius laetoides Burgeon, 1935
 Chlaenius laetus (Fabricius, 1794)
 Chlaenius laeviusculus Chaudoir, 1856
 Chlaenius lamottei (Basilewsky, 1951)
 Chlaenius lapillus Basilewsky, 1949
 Chlaenius latesternalis (Basilewsky, 1956)
 Chlaenius latipennis Sternberg, 1908
 Chlaenius leleupi (Basilewsky, 1952)
 Chlaenius levicollis Péringuey, 1926
 Chlaenius liocephalus (Basilewsky, 1952)
 Chlaenius lioderus Andrewes, 1923
 Chlaenius liothorax Alluaud, 1934
 Chlaenius lissoderus Chaudoir, 1876
 Chlaenius litongaensis Kirschenhofer, 2009
 Chlaenius loango Kirschenhofer, 2009
 Chlaenius lobozianus Alluaud, 1934
 Chlaenius loeblianus Kirschenhofer, 2004
 Chlaenius louwerensi Andrewes, 1936
 Chlaenius lucidicollis LaFerté-Sénectère, 1851
 Chlaenius luculentus Andrewes, 1920
 Chlaenius lujai Burgeon, 1935
 Chlaenius lulengae Burgeon, 1935
 Chlaenius lyperus (Jeannel, 1949)
 Chlaenius macropus Chaudoir, 1876
 Chlaenius madrasensis Kirschenhofer, 2004
 Chlaenius makokou Kirschenhofer, 2009
 Chlaenius marondera Kirschenhofer, 2011
 Chlaenius martinbaehri Kirschenhofer, 2008
 Chlaenius masoni Andrewes, 1923
 Chlaenius merklianus Kirschenhofer, 2012
 Chlaenius meteorus Alluaud, 1939
 Chlaenius meyeri Kirschenhofer, 2011
 Chlaenius moaboensis Kirschenhofer, 2009
 Chlaenius moheliensis Kirschenhofer, 2009
 Chlaenius mpanga Kirschenhofer, 2009
 Chlaenius mutatus Gemminger & Harold, 1868
 Chlaenius nilgiricus Andrewes, 1919
 Chlaenius nyika Kirschenhofer, 2009
 Chlaenius obsidianoides Alluaud, 1935
 Chlaenius obsidianus Alluaud, 1935
 Chlaenius oligochrysus Alluaud, 1934
 Chlaenius omochlorus Andrewes, 1931
 Chlaenius opacipennis LaFerté-Sénectère, 1851
 Chlaenius ostrinus Andrewes, 1924
 Chlaenius persimilis Chaudoir, 1876
 Chlaenius phaenoderus Chaudoir, 1876
 Chlaenius pradieri Chaudoir, 1876
 Chlaenius praefectus Bates, 1873
 Chlaenius pretiosus Chaudoir, 1856
 Chlaenius principalis Sternberg, 1908
 Chlaenius probsti Kirschenhofer, 2004
 Chlaenius pseudocupreolus Kirschenhofer, 2010
 Chlaenius pseudoglabratus Kirschenhofer, 2009
 Chlaenius pseudolulengae Kirschenhofer, 2009
 Chlaenius ptuchodes Andrewes, 1923
 Chlaenius pyrrhos Kirschenhofer, 2004
 Chlaenius quadricolor (Olivier, 1790)
 Chlaenius robertae Kavanaugh & Rainio, 2016
 Chlaenius robustus Boheman, 1848
 Chlaenius rubenticollis Kirschenhofer, 2009
 Chlaenius rudesculptus Chaudoir, 1876
 Chlaenius rufomarginatus Dejean, 1831
 Chlaenius saginatus LaFerté-Sénectère, 1851
 Chlaenius scheerpeltzi (Basilewsky, 1956)
 Chlaenius schmidtii Gestro, 1895
 Chlaenius sculptilis Bates, 1886
 Chlaenius semicupreus Basilewsky, 1949
 Chlaenius sierraleonensis Kirschenhofer, 2008
 Chlaenius sinensis Chaudoir, 1856
 Chlaenius splendidus Dejean, 1831
 Chlaenius stungtrengensis Kirschenhofer, 2004
 Chlaenius stygius (LaFerté-Sénectère, 1851)
 Chlaenius syangyaensis Kirschenhofer, 2004
 Chlaenius toubaensis Kirschenhofer, 2008
 Chlaenius touzalini Andrewes, 1920
 Chlaenius trachys Andrewes, 1923
 Chlaenius tshibindensis Burgeon, 1935
 Chlaenius tudicus Andrewes, 1919
 Chlaenius unyorensis Alluaud, 1934
 Chlaenius validicornis Boheman, 1848
 Chlaenius veselyi Kirschenhofer, 2004
 Chlaenius viangchanensis Kirschenhofer, 2011
 Chlaenius victoriae Kirschenhofer, 2009
 Chlaenius vividus Chaudoir, 1876
 Chlaenius wittmerianus Mandl, 1978
 Subgenus Anomoglossus Chaudoir, 1856
 Chlaenius amoenus Dejean, 1831
 Chlaenius emarginatus Say, 1823
 Chlaenius pusillus Say, 1823
 Subgenus Aulacosomus Grundmann, 1955
 Chlaenius gundlachi Chaudoir, 1876
 Chlaenius sallei Chaudoir, 1876
 Subgenus Baldochlaenius Basilewsky, 1950
 Chlaenius ampanihyensis Kirschenhofer, 2009
 Chlaenius cham Chaudoir, 1876
 Chlaenius clarksoni Barker, 1922
 Chlaenius dichrous Wiedemann, 1821
 Chlaenius dissimilis (Basilewsky, 1950)
 Chlaenius diversus Facchini, 2011
 Chlaenius erythrocnemis Chaudoir, 1876
 Chlaenius natalensis Chaudoir, 1876
 Chlaenius oodioides Chaudoir, 1876
 Chlaenius piceus Chaudoir, 1876
 Chlaenius simulatorius Barker, 1922
 Chlaenius trapezicollis Chaudoir, 1856
 Chlaenius vadoni (Basilewsky, 1950)
 Subgenus Callistochrous Chaudoir, 1850
 Chlaenius baxi (Gory, 1833)
 Subgenus Callistoderus Basilewsky, 1950
 Chlaenius clypeopatens (Basilewsky, 1949)
 Chlaenius longeantennatus (Basilewsky, 1951)
 Subgenus Callistodontus Basilewsky, 1965
 Chlaenius ghesquierei Burgeon, 1935
 Subgenus Callistoides Motschulsky, 1865
 Chlaenius amabilis Chaudoir, 1876
 Chlaenius caeruleiceps Bates, 1892
 Chlaenius changwatensis (Kirschenhofer, 1998)
 Chlaenius coquerelii Fairmaire, 1869
 Chlaenius deliciolus Bates, 1873
 Chlaenius gardoensis (Kirschenhofer, 2009)
 Chlaenius guttula Chaudoir, 1856
 Chlaenius indicus Jedlicka, 1956
 Chlaenius lativittis Chaudoir, 1876
 Chlaenius maculiceps Boheman, 1848
 Chlaenius malachinus (Motschulsky, 1865)
 Chlaenius melanopus Andrewes, 1923
 Chlaenius pericallus L.Redtenbacher, 1868
 Chlaenius pudicus (Fabricius, 1801)
 Chlaenius pulchellus Boheman, 1848
 Chlaenius pulchriceps Fairmaire, 1901
 Chlaenius pumilio Kolbe, 1889
 Chlaenius subferrugineus (Kirschenhofer, 2003)
 Chlaenius thieleni (Kirschenhofer, 1998)
 Chlaenius trinotatus LaFerté-Sénectère, 1851
 Chlaenius tripustulatus (Dejean, 1831)
 Chlaenius uninotatus Andrewes, 1919
 Chlaenius venustulus Dejean, 1831
 Chlaenius vitticollis Boheman, 1848
 Chlaenius xanthospilus (Wiedemann, 1821)
 Subgenus Callistometus Grundmann, 1956
 Chlaenius ruficauda Chaudoir, 1856
 Subgenus Calochlaenius Kuntzen, 1913
 Chlaenius makalolo Bates, 1886
 Chlaenius swahilius Bates, 1886
 Subgenus Capsochlaenius Basilewsky, 1950
 Chlaenius luisae Gestro, 1895
 Subgenus Chlaeniellus Reitter, 1908
 Chlaenius abjectus Andrewes, 1920
 Chlaenius alesi Jedlicka, 1935
 Chlaenius baoxingensis Kirschenhofer, 2004
 Chlaenius bergerdostali Kirschenhofer, 2016
 Chlaenius bonelli (Mateu, 1947)
 Chlaenius breuningi Jedlicka, 1931
 Chlaenius brevilabris LeConte, 1847
 Chlaenius circumcinctus Say, 1830
 Chlaenius circumductus A.Morawitz, 1862
 Chlaenius comans Andrewes, 1919
 Chlaenius cookei Andrewes, 1933
 Chlaenius coxalis Fischer von Waldheim, 1844
 Chlaenius curtii (Lemaire, 2001)
 Chlaenius differens Peyron, 1858
 Chlaenius douei Peyron, 1858
 Chlaenius etoshaensis Kirschenhofer, 2009
 Chlaenius extensus Mannerheim, 1825
 Chlaenius fastigatus Andrewes, 1921
 Chlaenius flaccidus G.Horn, 1876
 Chlaenius flavipes Ménétriés, 1832
 Chlaenius floridanus G.Horn, 1876
 Chlaenius fraterculus Maindron, 1899
 Chlaenius fugax Chaudoir, 1876
 Chlaenius gansuensis Jedlicka, 1935
 Chlaenius glaucus LeConte, 1856
 Chlaenius hainanensis Kirschenhofer, 2004
 Chlaenius hemichlorus Fairmaire, 1889
 Chlaenius impressicollis Chaudoir, 1876
 Chlaenius impunctifrons Say, 1823
 Chlaenius inops Chaudoir, 1856
 Chlaenius intermedius Chaudoir, 1856
 Chlaenius jacobsoni Andrewes, 1926
 Chlaenius jaleswarensis Kirschenhofer, 2004
 Chlaenius judianensis Kirschenhofer, 2004
 Chlaenius jureceki Jedlicka, 1935
 Chlaenius kindermanni Chaudoir, 1856
 Chlaenius kirschenhoferi Azadbakhsh, 2017
 Chlaenius laeviplaga Chaudoir, 1876
 Chlaenius langmusiensis Kirschenhofer, 2008
 Chlaenius latithorax Mannerheim in Chaudoir, 1844
 Chlaenius leigongshanensis Kirschenhofer, 2004
 Chlaenius lineicinctus Fairmaire, 1901
 Chlaenius manus Louwerens, 1969
 Chlaenius marginellus Dejean, 1831
 Chlaenius marginicollis Boheman, 1848
 Chlaenius melampus Ménétriés, 1848
 Chlaenius nebraskensis LeConte, 1856
 Chlaenius nemoralis Say, 1823
 Chlaenius nigricornis (Fabricius, 1787)
 Chlaenius nitidulus (Schrank, 1781)
 Chlaenius obscurus Klug, 1832
 Chlaenius obsoletus LeConte, 1851
 Chlaenius olivieri Crotch, 1871
 Chlaenius oxygonus Chaudoir, 1843
 Chlaenius pennsylvanicus Say, 1823
 Chlaenius pertinax Casey, 1920
 Chlaenius pilosicoerulans Mandl, 1989
 Chlaenius pratensis Chaudoir, 1876
 Chlaenius prostenus Bates, 1873
 Chlaenius pseudotristis Chanu & Swaminathan, 2017
 Chlaenius puncticephalis Saha, 1984
 Chlaenius rafiki Alluaud, 1929
 Chlaenius richardsi Ali, 1967
 Chlaenius sagaingensis Kirschenhofer, 2005
 Chlaenius semenowi Tschitscherine, 1896
 Chlaenius semiviridis Andrewes, 1920
 Chlaenius shaanxinensis Kirschenhofer, 2004
 Chlaenius similatus Boheman, 1848
 Chlaenius simillimus Chaudoir, 1856
 Chlaenius sinuatus Dejean, 1826
 Chlaenius stenoristus Chaudoir, 1876
 Chlaenius sterbai Jedlicka, 1935
 Chlaenius submarginatus Chaudoir, 1876
 Chlaenius syriacus Chaudoir, 1876
 Chlaenius tenuelimbatus Ballion, 1871
 Chlaenius terminatus Dejean, 1826
 Chlaenius texanus G.Horn, 1876
 Chlaenius tibialis Dejean, 1826
 Chlaenius topali Kirschenhofer, 2004
 Chlaenius tricolor Dejean, 1826
 Chlaenius tristis (Schaller, 1783)
 Chlaenius vafer LeConte, 1852
 Chlaenius variabilipes Eschscholtz, 1833
 Chlaenius velocipes Chaudoir, 1876
 Chlaenius vestitus (Paykull, 1790)
 Chlaenius wuxiangensis Kirschenhofer, 2011
 Subgenus Chlaenioctenus Bates, 1892
 Chlaenius aodai Liu & Liang, 2013
 Chlaenius bilyi Kirschenhofer, 2009
 Chlaenius bodhidharma Liu & Liang, 2013
 Chlaenius cheni Liu & Liang, 2013
 Chlaenius chiangdaoensis Kirschenhofer, 2020
 Chlaenius eneides Bates, 1892
 Chlaenius freyi Jedlicka, 1960
 Chlaenius langsonensis Kirschenhofer, 2008
 Chlaenius li Liu & Liang, 2013
 Chlaenius pectinipes Bates, 1892
 Chlaenius piligenys Liu & Liang, 2010
 Chlaenius rotundithorax Liu & Kavanaugh, 2010
 Chlaenius schillhammeri Kirschenhofer, 2003
 Chlaenius sehnali Kirschenhofer, 2008
 Chlaenius sikkimensis Kirschenhofer, 2013
 Chlaenius tingaudi Lassalle, 2015
 Subgenus Chlaeniodromus Basilewsky, 1950
 Chlaenius tetraphacus Alluaud, 1918
 Subgenus Chlaeniodus Jeannel, 1949
 Chlaenius longulus (Jeannel, 1949)
 Chlaenius perrieri Fairmaire, 1901
 Subgenus Chlaenionus Kuntzen, 1913
 Chlaenius aethiopicus Chaudoir, 1876
 Chlaenius colasi Kirschenhofer, 2008
 Chlaenius dohrnii (Bertoloni, 1857)
 Chlaenius katanganus Burgeon, 1935
 Chlaenius mkongoensis Kirschenhofer, 2016
 Chlaenius pendjariensis Kirschenhofer, 2011
 Chlaenius perpunctatus Kuntzen, 1913
 Chlaenius schoutedeni Burgeon, 1935
 Chlaenius variolosus Kirschenhofer, 2008
 Chlaenius zanzibaricus Chaudoir, 1883
 Subgenus Chlaeniostenodes Basilewsky, 1953
 Chlaenius backanensis Kirschenhofer, 2014
 Chlaenius canariensis Dejean, 1831
 Chlaenius cherensis Kirschenhofer, 1999
 Chlaenius coeruleipennis Boheman, 1860
 Chlaenius dureli Maindron, 1899
 Chlaenius gaoligongensis Kirschenhofer, 2011
 Chlaenius laeticollis Chaudoir, 1876
 Chlaenius melanopterus Chaudoir, 1876
 Chlaenius modestus Boheman, 1848
 Chlaenius nigripennis Chaudoir, 1856
 Chlaenius persicus L.Redtenbacher, 1850
 Chlaenius prabangensis Kirschenhofer, 2009
 Chlaenius ruthmuellerae Kirschenhofer, 2008
 Chlaenius schatzmayri Basilewsky, 1949
 Chlaenius semperi Chaudoir, 1876
 Chlaenius skukuzaensis Kirschenhofer, 2008
 Chlaenius suensoni Mandl, 1992
 Chlaenius tansaniensis Kirschenhofer, 1999
 Chlaenius wewalkai Kirschenhofer, 2008
 Subgenus Chlaeniostenus Kuntzen, 1919
 Chlaenius accedens Chaudoir, 1876
 Chlaenius acroxanthus Chaudoir, 1876
 Chlaenius amauropterus Chaudoir, 1856
 Chlaenius angustatus Dejean, 1831
 Chlaenius anthracoderus LaFerté-Sénectère, 1851
 Chlaenius apicalis (Wiedemann, 1819)
 Chlaenius assamensis Kirschenhofer, 2003
 Chlaenius attenuatus Klug, 1833
 Chlaenius balthasari Jedlicka, 1935
 Chlaenius camerunensis Kirschenhofer, 2003
 Chlaenius ceramensis Kirschenhofer, 2003
 Chlaenius circumdatus Brullé, 1835
 Chlaenius congoensis Burgeon, 1935
 Chlaenius consobrinus Péringuey, 1896
 Chlaenius cupripennis Chaudoir, 1876
 Chlaenius cylindricollis Dejean, 1831
 Chlaenius daer Darlington, 1968
 Chlaenius darlingensis Laporte, 1867
 Chlaenius denticulatus Dejean, 1831
 Chlaenius dorsalis Dejean, 1831
 Chlaenius epistrophus Alluaud, 1927
 Chlaenius euryscopus Bates, 1886
 Chlaenius fraternus Kolbe, 1889
 Chlaenius helios Kirschenhofer, 2019
 Chlaenius hunanensis Kirschenhofer, 2003
 Chlaenius janaki Kirschenhofer, 2009
 Chlaenius jucundulus (Basilewsky, 1970)
 Chlaenius kathrynae Kavanaugh & Rainio, 2016
 Chlaenius kenieroba Kirschenhofer, 2019
 Chlaenius kivuanus Basilewsky, 1949
 Chlaenius leopoldi Burgeon, 1935
 Chlaenius leucoristus Chaudoir, 1876
 Chlaenius lirifer Andrewes, 1941
 Chlaenius melancholicus LaFerté-Sénectère, 1851
 Chlaenius merkli Kirschenhofer, 2003
 Chlaenius nigrans Kirschenhofer, 2003
 Chlaenius nitidicollis Dejean, 1826
 Chlaenius noeli Alluaud, 1933
 Chlaenius nubicus Chaudoir, 1876
 Chlaenius overlaeti Burgeon, 1935
 Chlaenius pachys Chaudoir, 1876
 Chlaenius perinetanus Facchini, 2011
 Chlaenius philemon Andrewes, 1936
 Chlaenius postscriptus Bates, 1873
 Chlaenius prolixus Erichson, 1843
 Chlaenius propinquus Csiki, 1931
 Chlaenius pulcher Nietner, 1856
 Chlaenius punctatostriatus Chaudoir, 1856
 Chlaenius rugulosus Nietner, 1856
 Chlaenius scotti Alluaud, 1937
 Chlaenius sellatus Dejean, 1831
 Chlaenius sibutensis Kirschenhofer, 2009
 Chlaenius similis Chaudoir, 1856
 Chlaenius sollicitus LaFerté-Sénectère, 1851
 Chlaenius subcostatus W.J.MacLeay, 1864
 Chlaenius subovatus Chaudoir, 1876
 Chlaenius sulcipennis Dejean, 1826
 Chlaenius synaptus Alluaud, 1918
 Chlaenius tenuicollis (Fabricius, 1801)
 Chlaenius transfuga Chaudoir, 1876
 Chlaenius tsanerenaensis Kirschenhofer, 2009
 Chlaenius vitalisi Andrewes, 1919
 Subgenus Chlaenites Motschulsky, 1860
 Chlaenius inderiensis Motschulsky, 1849
 Chlaenius spoliatus (P.Rossi, 1792)
 Subgenus Chlaenius Bonelli, 1810
 Chlaenius adonis Andrewes, 1923
 Chlaenius aestivus Say, 1823
 Chlaenius alaotraensis Kirschenhofer, 2009
 Chlaenius alfredpuchneri Kirschenhofer, 2014
 Chlaenius allardianus Lorenz, 1998
 Chlaenius amazonicus Chaudoir, 1876
 Chlaenius amydrus Alluaud, 1934
 Chlaenius androyanus Jeannel, 1949
 Chlaenius arakanensis (Brunk & Kirschenhofer, 2016)
 Chlaenius atratus Chaudoir, 1876
 Chlaenius augustus Newman, 1838
 Chlaenius auripilis Andrewes, 1936
 Chlaenius azurescens Chaudoir, 1876
 Chlaenius bakwuensis Kirschenhofer, 2004
 Chlaenius binghami Andrewes, 1919
 Chlaenius brasiliensis Dejean, 1831
 Chlaenius breviusculus Chaudoir, 1876
 Chlaenius chalcoderus Chaudoir, 1876
 Chlaenius chalcothorax Wiedemann, 1823
 Chlaenius chaudoiri G.Horn, 1876
 Chlaenius collarti Alluaud, 1933
 Chlaenius communimacula Chaudoir, 1883
 Chlaenius cordifer Bates, 1891
 Chlaenius coscinioderus Chaudoir, 1856
 Chlaenius cosciniophorus Chaudoir, 1876
 Chlaenius cribellicollis Chaudoir, 1876
 Chlaenius cruciatus Dejean, 1831
 Chlaenius cubanus Chaudoir, 1876
 Chlaenius cumatilis LeConte, 1851
 Chlaenius cursor Chevrolat, 1835
 Chlaenius densaticollis Fairmaire, 1901
 Chlaenius deserticola Raffray, 1886
 Chlaenius deuvei Kirschenhofer, 2008
 Chlaenius dinodoides Chaudoir, 1876
 Chlaenius discopictus Fairmaire, 1893
 Chlaenius dusaultii (L.Dufour, 1821)
 Chlaenius erythropus Germar, 1823
 Chlaenius eurybates Bates, 1891
 Chlaenius fallax (Olivier, 1795)
 Chlaenius festivus (Panzer, 1796)
 Chlaenius fizianus Basilewsky, 1961
 Chlaenius flavicornis Fischer von Waldheim, 1842
 Chlaenius forreri Bates, 1884
 Chlaenius fritzweiserti Kirschenhofer, 2018
 Chlaenius fuscicornis Dejean, 1831
 Chlaenius geayi Jeannel, 1949
 Chlaenius gonioderus LaFerté-Sénectère, 1851
 Chlaenius guatemalenus Bates, 1882
 Chlaenius herbaceus Chevrolat, 1834
 Chlaenius horni Sternberg, 1908
 Chlaenius humeralis Chaudoir, 1856
 Chlaenius indutus Klug, 1833
 Chlaenius isaloensis Kirschenhofer, 2009
 Chlaenius itombwanus Basilewsky, 1961
 Chlaenius ivorensis Facchini, 2011
 Chlaenius jamaicae Darlington, 1936
 Chlaenius kolariensis Maindron, 1898
 Chlaenius kryzhanovskyi Basilewsky, 1968
 Chlaenius lafertei Guérin-Méneville, 1843
 Chlaenius lateralis Brullé, 1838
 Chlaenius laticollis Say, 1823
 Chlaenius leprieuri Gory, 1833
 Chlaenius leptopus Basilewsky, 1956
 Chlaenius lineellus Motschulsky, 1859
 Chlaenius lomii G.Müller, 1941
 Chlaenius longicornis Chaudoir, 1843
 Chlaenius loxias Kirschenhofer, 2004
 Chlaenius luzonicus Chaudoir, 1856
 Chlaenius maculatus Dejean, 1826
 Chlaenius madangensis Kirschenhofer, 2009
 Chlaenius mandli Grundmann, 1956
 Chlaenius meticulosus LaFerté-Sénectère, 1851
 Chlaenius milloti Jeannel, 1949
 Chlaenius monardi Alluaud, 1934
 Chlaenius morosus LaFerté-Sénectère, 1851
 Chlaenius nigroscelis Chaudoir, 1856
 Chlaenius nitidiceps Dejean, 1826
 Chlaenius nitidifrons Fairmaire, 1901
 Chlaenius notabilis LaFerté-Sénectère, 1851
 Chlaenius obesus LaFerté-Sénectère, 1851
 Chlaenius oblongus Dejean, 1826
 Chlaenius obscuripennis Chevrolat, 1835
 Chlaenius obtusus Dejean, 1831
 Chlaenius orbus G.Horn, 1871
 Chlaenius pailinensis Kirschenhofer, 2011
 Chlaenius pallipes (Gebler, 1823)
 Chlaenius patruelis LeConte, 1844
 Chlaenius phenax Basilewsky, 1949
 Chlaenius planipennis Chaudoir, 1876
 Chlaenius planulatus Bates, 1884
 Chlaenius platensis G.R.Waterhouse, 1841
 Chlaenius platyderus Chaudoir, 1856
 Chlaenius platynoides Alluaud, 1934
 Chlaenius plausibilis Basilewsky, 1949
 Chlaenius porinus Alluaud, 1929
 Chlaenius porphyrius Bates, 1891
 Chlaenius porrectus Chaudoir, 1876
 Chlaenius pseudocruciatus Kirschenhofer, 2009
 Chlaenius pseudoglaber (Casale, 1984)
 Chlaenius puberulus Boheman, 1848
 Chlaenius pubipennis Chaudoir, 1856
 Chlaenius putzeysi Chaudoir, 1876
 Chlaenius quadrinotatus Dejean, 1826
 Chlaenius quadriornatus Basilewsky, 1956
 Chlaenius quadrisignatus Boheman, 1860
 Chlaenius ranavalonae Csiki, 1931
 Chlaenius rhysonotus Fairmaire, 1901
 Chlaenius riparius Lorenz, 1998
 Chlaenius ripicola Andrewes, 1937
 Chlaenius rodriguezi Chaudoir, 1876
 Chlaenius rukwaensis Kirschenhofer, 2007
 Chlaenius scabricollis Chevrolat, 1833
 Chlaenius scapularis Chaudoir, 1876
 Chlaenius sciakyi Kirschenhofer, 2004
 Chlaenius scutellaris Harold, 1881
 Chlaenius senegalensis Dejean, 1831
 Chlaenius sericeus (Forster, 1771)
 Chlaenius signatus Boheman, 1848
 Chlaenius silvestrii G.Müller, 1942
 Chlaenius sivorii Chaudoir, 1876
 Chlaenius soccatus Say, 1830
 Chlaenius sparsepunctatus Chaudoir, 1876
 Chlaenius sparsus LeConte, 1863
 Chlaenius straneoi Basilewsky, 1949
 Chlaenius subglaber (Andrewes, 1937)
 Chlaenius subsulcatus Dejean, 1831
 Chlaenius suppletor Bates, 1891
 Chlaenius systolocranioides Alluaud, 1933
 Chlaenius tartagalensis Kirschenhofer, 2014
 Chlaenius tchabalensis Kirschenhofer, 2009
 Chlaenius testaceicrus Fairmaire, 1891
 Chlaenius tetraspilus Alluaud, 1918
 Chlaenius tinantae Burgeon, 1935
 Chlaenius transversalis Dejean, 1831
 Chlaenius tuky Basilewsky, 1949
 Chlaenius uluguruanus Basilewsky, 1956
 Chlaenius uzungwensis Basilewsky, 1951
 Chlaenius velutinus (Duftschmid, 1812)
 Chlaenius viduus G.Horn, 1871
 Chlaenius violatus Gemminger & Harold, 1868
 Chlaenius virescens Chaudoir, 1835
 Chlaenius viridicollis Reiche, 1843
 Chlaenius walterrossii Giachino & Allegro, 2018
 Chlaenius ziloensis Basilewsky, 1970
 Chlaenius zygogrammus LaFerté-Sénectère, 1851
 Subgenus Compsochlaenius Alluaud, 1916
 Chlaenius acutecostatus Alluaud, 1933
 Chlaenius eyeni Basilewsky, 1949
 Chlaenius longeantennatus (Basilewsky, 1952)
 Chlaenius postmaculatus (Basilewsky, 1952)
 Chlaenius sankuruensis Burgeon, 1935
 Chlaenius treichi Alluaud, 1916
 Subgenus Dacnochlaenius Alluaud, 1919
 Chlaenius benyovszkyi (Csiki, 1931)
 Chlaenius guineensis (Alluaud, 1925)
 Chlaenius soricinus Gerstaecker, 1867
 Subgenus Dinodes Bonelli, 1810
 Chlaenius armenus Jedlicka, 1950
 Chlaenius baeticus (Rambur, 1837)
 Chlaenius cruralis Fischer von Waldheim, 1829
 Chlaenius decipiens (L.Dufour, 1820)
 Chlaenius dives Dejean, 1826
 Chlaenius fulgidicollis (L.Dufour, 1820)
 Chlaenius huedepohli Mandl, 1983
 Chlaenius viridis (Ménétriés, 1832)
 Subgenus Eochlaenius Semenov, 1912
 Chlaenius suvorovi (Semenov, 1912)
 Subgenus Epomis Bonelli, 1810
 Chlaenius alluaudi Fairmaire, 1901
 Chlaenius amarae Andrewes, 1920
 Chlaenius barkeri Csiki, 1931
 Chlaenius bocandei (LaFerté-Sénectère, 1852)
 Chlaenius circumscriptus (Duftschmid, 1812)
 Chlaenius croesus (Fabricius, 1801)
 Chlaenius croyi Kirschenhofer, 2003
 Chlaenius daressalaami Jedlicka, 1957
 Chlaenius dejeanii (Dejean, 1831)
 Chlaenius deplanatus (LaFerté-Sénectère, 1851)
 Chlaenius duvaucelii (Dejean, 1831)
 Chlaenius elisabethanus Burgeon, 1935
 Chlaenius elongatus (Klug, 1833)
 Chlaenius fimbriatus (Klug, 1833)
 Chlaenius immunitus Murray, 1858
 Chlaenius jordani (Basilewsky, 1955)
 Chlaenius kenyerii Kirschenhofer, 2003
 Chlaenius lastii Bates, 1886
 Chlaenius latreillei (LaFerté-Sénectère, 1852)
 Chlaenius loveridgei (Basilewsky, 1951)
 Chlaenius nigricans Wiedemann, 1821
 Chlaenius nossibianus Facchini, 2011
 Chlaenius protensus Chaudoir, 1876
 Chlaenius rhodesianus Péringuey, 1898
 Chlaenius simba Alluaud, 1929
 Chlaenius tschitscherini Jedlicka, 1952
 Chlaenius vientianensis Kirschenhofer, 2009
 Chlaenius violaceipennis Chaudoir, 1876
 Subgenus Eudinodes Basilewsky, 1965
 Chlaenius cavilabrum Barker, 1922
 Chlaenius oneili Barker, 1922
 Chlaenius superstes Péringuey, 1926
 Subgenus Eurydactylus LaFerté-Sénectère, 1851
 Chlaenius aurolimbatus (LaFerté-Sénectère, 1851)
 Chlaenius koltzei (Grundmann, 1956)
 Chlaenius menevillei Chaudoir, 1876
 Chlaenius pimalicus Casey, 1914
 Chlaenius soginoides Chaudoir, 1876
 Chlaenius tomentosus (Say, 1823)
 Chlaenius validus (Chevrolat, 1835)
 Subgenus Goniodinodes Jeannel, 1949
 Chlaenius darlingtoni (Basilewsky, 1951)
 Chlaenius howa Künckel d'Herculais, 1891
 Chlaenius pseudoraffrayi Basilewsky, 1949
 Chlaenius raffrayi Chaudoir, 1876
 Subgenus Haplochlaenius Lutshnik, 1933
 Chlaenius baehri (Kirschenhofer, 1998)
 Chlaenius costiger Chaudoir, 1856
 Chlaenius drescheri Louwerens, 1951
 Chlaenius evae Wrase, 2012
 Chlaenius femoratus Dejean, 1826
 Chlaenius hutiaoxiaensis Kirschenhofer, 2011
 Chlaenius insularis (Ueno, 1964)
 Chlaenius klapperichi Jedlicka, 1956
 Chlaenius moluccensis Kirschenhofer, 2003
 Chlaenius nanlingensis Deuve & Tian, 2005
 Chlaenius pan Darlington, 1968
 Chlaenius pantarensis Kirschenhofer, 2014
 Chlaenius peltastes Jedlicka, 1935
 Chlaenius qinqchensis Wrase & Kirschenhofer, 2012
 Chlaenius ramezani Azadbakhsh & Kirschenhofer, 2019
 Chlaenius sabahensis Kirschenhofer, 1998
 Chlaenius wegneri Louwerens, 1953
 Subgenus Hemichlaenius Bates, 1892
 Chlaenius microspilus (Bates, 1892)
 Subgenus Homalolachnus LaFerté-Sénectère, 1851
 Chlaenius colmanti Alluaud, 1933
 Chlaenius epicosmoides (Basilewsky, 1956)
 Chlaenius feanus Bates, 1892
 Chlaenius flavoscriptus Quedenfeldt, 1891
 Chlaenius goossensi Alluaud, 1933
 Chlaenius helvetorum Burgeon, 1935
 Chlaenius himalayicus Andrewes, 1923
 Chlaenius impictus Alluaud, 1933
 Chlaenius kashituensis Kirschenhofer, 2009
 Chlaenius katanga Kirschenhofer, 2009
 Chlaenius lineatus Putzeys, 1880
 Chlaenius moestus Csiki, 1931
 Chlaenius morettoi Kirschenhofer, 2008
 Chlaenius nigerrimus Jedlicka, 1958
 Chlaenius panagaeoides (LaFerté-Sénectère, 1851)
 Chlaenius quadrivittatus Jedlicka, 1958
 Chlaenius ruvumaensis Kirschenhofer, 2008
 Chlaenius sexguttatus Andrewes, 1919
 Chlaenius sexmaculatus Dejean, 1831
 Chlaenius sibuti Alluaud, 1915
 Chlaenius sykesi Hope, 1833
 Chlaenius umtalianus (Péringuey, 1904)
 Chlaenius vertagoides (LaFerté-Sénectère, 1851)
 Chlaenius vethi Bates, 1889
 Subgenus Indalma Schmidt-Goebel, 1846
 Chlaenius elegans (Schmidt-Goebel, 1846)
 Subgenus Leptodinodes Jeannel, 1949
 Chlaenius parallelus Dejean, 1831
 Subgenus Leptorembus Kolbe, 1889
 Chlaenius angolanus (Basilewsky, 1953)
 Chlaenius flavomaculatus (Kolbe, 1889)
 Chlaenius kolbei (Duvivier, 1892)
 Chlaenius kwazuluensis Kirschenhofer, 2009
 Chlaenius nimbanus (Basilewsky, 1951)
 Chlaenius varians Chaudoir, 1876
 Subgenus Lissauchenius W.S.MacLeay, 1825
 Chlaenius ammon (Fabricius, 1801)
 Chlaenius analisimilis Pomeroy, 1932
 Chlaenius antennatus Chaudoir, 1876
 Chlaenius aspericollis Bates, 1873
 Chlaenius assecla LaFerté-Sénectère, 1851
 Chlaenius atropos Andrewes, 1941
 Chlaenius bandjermasinensis Kirschenhofer, 2008
 Chlaenius bifenestratus Klug, 1832
 Chlaenius bioculatus Chaudoir, 1856
 Chlaenius bivulnerus Motschulsky, 1858
 Chlaenius boali Kirschenhofer, 2016
 Chlaenius boisduvalii Dejean, 1831
 Chlaenius borgouensis Kirschenhofer, 2007
 Chlaenius boukali Kirschenhofer, 2005
 Chlaenius caecus Dejean, 1831
 Chlaenius chainatensis Kirschenhofer, 2011
 Chlaenius chapanus Andrewes, 1919
 Chlaenius chrysoderus Chaudoir, 1876
 Chlaenius crebrepunctatus Chaudoir, 1856
 Chlaenius cribellatus Chaudoir, 1876
 Chlaenius darfurensis Kirschenhofer, 2007
 Chlaenius distigma Chaudoir, 1876
 Chlaenius dondoensis Kirschenhofer, 2007
 Chlaenius effugiens Péringuey, 1908
 Chlaenius eritreaensis Kirschenhofer, 2007
 Chlaenius farai Jedlicka, 1949
 Chlaenius fasciger Chaudoir, 1883
 Chlaenius fenestratus Chaudoir, 1876
 Chlaenius flaviguttatus W.S.MacLeay, 1825
 Chlaenius fulvipes (Chaudoir, 1835)
 Chlaenius geisthardti Kirschenhofer, 2007
 Chlaenius geniculatus (Basilewsky, 1956)
 Chlaenius gestroi Chaudoir, 1876
 Chlaenius goryi Gory, 1833
 Chlaenius heyrovskyi Jedlicka, 1949
 Chlaenius hildebrandti Harold, 1881
 Chlaenius imperialis Sternberg, 1908
 Chlaenius kaszabi Jedlicka, 1951
 Chlaenius keniaensis Kirschenhofer, 2008
 Chlaenius kilimanus (Basilewsky, 1956)
 Chlaenius kira Alluaud, 1929
 Chlaenius kraatzi Sternberg, 1908
 Chlaenius laosensis Kirschenhofer, 2008
 Chlaenius limbicollis Chaudoir, 1876
 Chlaenius lombokensis Kirschenhofer, 2008
 Chlaenius maculiger Laporte, 1867
 Chlaenius meiguensis Kirschenhofer, 2015
 Chlaenius momboensis Kirschenhofer, 2007
 Chlaenius montivagus Andrewes, 1923
 Chlaenius naeviger A.Morawitz, 1862
 Chlaenius nepos Chaudoir, 1876
 Chlaenius nigratus Kirschenhofer, 2007
 Chlaenius oculatus (Fabricius, 1801)
 Chlaenius olthofi Darlington, 1968
 Chlaenius orphanus Péringuey, 1908
 Chlaenius ovampo Péringuey, 1892
 Chlaenius paluensis Kirschenhofer, 2011
 Chlaenius perspicillaris Erichson, 1843
 Chlaenius pongraczi Jedlicka, 1951
 Chlaenius posticalis Motschulsky, 1854
 Chlaenius procerulus Kirschenhofer, 2009
 Chlaenius pseudobipustulatus Facchini, 2011
 Chlaenius puchneri Kirschenhofer, 2007
 Chlaenius pyrrhopodus Fairmaire, 1903
 Chlaenius roeschkei Sternberg, 1908
 Chlaenius rucickai Kirschenhofer, 2015
 Chlaenius rudicollis Chaudoir, 1876
 Chlaenius rufifemoratus (W.S.MacLeay, 1825)
 Chlaenius seiferti Kirschenhofer, 2005
 Chlaenius semipurpureus Motschulsky, 1865
 Chlaenius seyrigi Alluaud, 1935
 Chlaenius sichuanensis Kirschenhofer, 2008
 Chlaenius simbabwensis Kirschenhofer, 2008
 Chlaenius stichai Jedlicka, 1949
 Chlaenius suavis Alluaud, 1939
 Chlaenius sumbavaensis Kirschenhofer, 2014
 Chlaenius superbus Sternberg, 1908
 Chlaenius tanahrataensis Kirschenhofer, 2008
 Chlaenius tetragonoderus Chaudoir, 1876
 Chlaenius thiesensis Kirschenhofer, 2007
 Chlaenius toliaraensis Kirschenhofer, 2015
 Chlaenius udaipurensis Chanu & Swaminathan, 2017
 Chlaenius unicolor Chaudoir, 1856
 Chlaenius variipes Chaudoir, 1856
 Chlaenius wuduensis KIrschenhofer, 2013
 Chlaenius xanthomerus Alluaud, 1918
 Chlaenius yangonensis Kirschenhofer, 2005
 Chlaenius yunnanulus Mandl, 1992
 Subgenus Lithochlaenius Kryzhanovskij, 1976
 Chlaenius agilis Chaudoir, 1856
 Chlaenius agiloides Jedlicka, 1935
 Chlaenius argentinicus Jedlicka, 1946
 Chlaenius chlorochrous Chaudoir, 1876
 Chlaenius chuanqianensis Liu & Liang, 2011
 Chlaenius cordicollis Kirby, 1837
 Chlaenius ecuadoricus Jedlicka, 1946
 Chlaenius formosensis Lorenz, 1998
 Chlaenius leishanensis Kirschenhofer, 2005
 Chlaenius leucoscelis Chevrolat, 1835
 Chlaenius linwensini Liu & Liang, 2011
 Chlaenius noguchii Bates, 1873
 Chlaenius peruanus Erichson, 1847
 Chlaenius prasinus Dejean, 1826
 Chlaenius propeagilis Liu & Kavanaugh, 2011
 Chlaenius purpureus Chaudoir, 1876
 Chlaenius rambouseki Lutshnik, 1933
 Chlaenius solitarius Say, 1823
 Chlaenius wrasei (Kirschenhofer, 1997)
 Subgenus Lomasa Andrewes, 1919
 Chlaenius xanthacrus Wiedemann, 1823
 Subgenus Macrochlaenites Kuntzen, 1919
 Chlaenius alexanderdostali Kirschenhofer, 2008
 Chlaenius hostilis Putzeys, 1880
 Chlaenius humphreyi Alluaud, 1927
 Chlaenius lugens Chaudoir, 1876
 Chlaenius morio Boheman, 1860
 Chlaenius nigrita Dejean, 1826
 Chlaenius sennaariensis Chaudoir, 1856
 Chlaenius surdipennis (Jeannel, 1949)
 Chlaenius waddellii Murray, 1858
 Subgenus Metachlaeniodus Jeannel, 1949
 Chlaenius holomelas (Alluaud, 1915)
 Subgenus Naelichus Lutshnik, 1933
 Chlaenius stschukini Ménétriés, 1837
 Subgenus Ocybatus LaFerté-Sénectère, 1851
 Chlaenius berndjaegeri Kirschenhofer, 2008
 Chlaenius bohemani Chaudoir, 1856
 Chlaenius boueti (Jeannel, 1949)
 Chlaenius bulirschi Kirschenhofer, 2010
 Chlaenius decorsei Alluaud, 1916
 Chlaenius deyrollei (LaFerté-Sénectère, 1851)
 Chlaenius dhawalagiriensis Kirschenhofer, 2002
 Chlaenius discicollis (LaFerté-Sénectère, 1851)
 Chlaenius dissidens Péringuey, 1926
 Chlaenius ditulus Péringuey, 1904
 Chlaenius djaina Maindron, 1899
 Chlaenius eggeri Kirschenhofer, 2011
 Chlaenius exilis Andrewes, 1923
 Chlaenius gunganagarensis Kirschenhofer, 2009
 Chlaenius hornburgi Kirschenhofer, 2008
 Chlaenius junceus Andrewes, 1923
 Chlaenius latipalpis Mandl, 1992
 Chlaenius lijiangensis Anichtchenko & Kirschenhofer, 2016
 Chlaenius maputoensis Kirschenhofer, 2007
 Chlaenius marleyi Barker, 1922
 Chlaenius medioguttatus Chaudoir, 1876
 Chlaenius moraveci Kirschenhofer, 2009
 Chlaenius newdehliensis Kirschenhofer, 2002
 Chlaenius orbicollis Chaudoir, 1876
 Chlaenius orbiculicollis Barker, 1922
 Chlaenius pailin Kirschenhofer, 2011
 Chlaenius patrizii (Basilewsky, 1953)
 Chlaenius pauxillus Kirschenhofer, 2002
 Chlaenius pleuroderus Chaudoir, 1883
 Chlaenius rampurensis Kirschenhofer, 2009
 Chlaenius rebellis Péringuey, 1926
 Chlaenius reichei (LaFerté-Sénectère, 1851)
 Chlaenius rubricrus Alluaud, 1916
 Chlaenius schuelei Kirschenhofer, 2007
 Chlaenius spathulifer Bates, 1873
 Chlaenius taiwanensis Kirschenhofer, 2014
 Chlaenius tecospilus Alluaud, 1933
 Chlaenius tenuis Fairmaire, 1901
 Chlaenius vinhphuensis Kirschenhofer, 2009
 Chlaenius vulneratus Dejean, 1831
 Chlaenius wittei (Basilewsky, 1953)
 Subgenus Oochlaenius Alluaud, 1933
 Chlaenius kivuensis Alluaud, 1933
 Subgenus Orinochlaenius Basilewsky, 1950
 Chlaenius wittei Burgeon, 1937
 Subgenus Pachydinodes Kuntzen, 1919
 Chlaenius abstersus Bates, 1873
 Chlaenius betrokaensis Kirschenhofer, 2009
 Chlaenius bipustulatus Boheman, 1848
 Chlaenius bisignatus Dejean, 1826
 Chlaenius chomthongensis Kirschenhofer, 2002
 Chlaenius conformis Dejean, 1831
 Chlaenius controversus Péringuey, 1926
 Chlaenius dajuensis Kirschenhofer, 2002
 Chlaenius diephelus Alluaud, 1934
 Chlaenius eruditus Kirschenhofer, 2002
 Chlaenius feronoides Murray, 1858
 Chlaenius fouquei Kirschenhofer, 2016
 Chlaenius glabricollis Dejean, 1831
 Chlaenius hamatus Dejean, 1831
 Chlaenius hamifer Chaudoir, 1856
 Chlaenius horaki Kirschenhofer, 2015
 Chlaenius ikedai Kasahara, 1991
 Chlaenius insulanus Louwerens, 1956
 Chlaenius janus Kirschenhofer, 2002
 Chlaenius kanarae Andrewes, 1919
 Chlaenius leucops (Wiedemann, 1823)
 Chlaenius lunatus Dejean, 1826
 Chlaenius madecassus Csiki, 1931
 Chlaenius malcheri Emden, 1937
 Chlaenius maowensis Kirschenhofer, 2008
 Chlaenius mederici Kirschenhofer, 2015
 Chlaenius multicolor Andrewes, 1919
 Chlaenius obenbergeri Jedlicka, 1935
 Chlaenius ophonoides Fairmaire, 1843
 Chlaenius ovalipennis Quedenfeldt, 1883
 Chlaenius pandagensis Kirschenhofer, 2002
 Chlaenius paromius Basilewsky, 1949
 Chlaenius pictus Chaudoir, 1856
 Chlaenius posticus (Fabricius, 1798)
 Chlaenius pubifer Chaudoir, 1876
 Chlaenius radama Künckel d'Herculais, 1891
 Chlaenius rajasthanensis Kirschenhofer, 2002
 Chlaenius sagittarius Dejean, 1831
 Chlaenius siccus Darlington, 1968
 Chlaenius simplex Wiedemann, 1821
 Chlaenius sokotranus Csiki, 1931
 Chlaenius suberbiei (Jeannel, 1949)
 Chlaenius tansaniensis Kirschenhofer, 2011
 Chlaenius taveuniensis Kirschenhofer, 2016
 Chlaenius tiomanensis Kirschenhofer, 2015
 Chlaenius virgulatus (Jeannel, 1949)
 Chlaenius virgulifer Chaudoir, 1876
 Chlaenius wenchuanensis Kirschenhofer, 2008
 Subgenus Paracallistoides Basilewsky, 1965
 Chlaenius anischenkoi (Kirschenhofer, 2010)
 Chlaenius ernesti Gory, 1833
 Chlaenius freynei Burgeon, 1937
 Chlaenius fulvicollis Chaudoir, 1876
 Chlaenius kirki Chaudoir, 1876
 Chlaenius luluanus (Basilewsky, 1949)
 Chlaenius maxi Gory, 1833
 Chlaenius notula (Fabricius, 1801)
 Chlaenius opistographus Alluaud, 1934
 Chlaenius sassanus Alluaud, 1934
 Chlaenius watsaensis Burgeon, 1935
 Subgenus Paralissauchenius Kirschenhofer, 2002
 Chlaenius chuji Jedlicka, 1946
 Chlaenius jaegeri Kirschenhofer, 2002
 Chlaenius posticemaculatus Kirschenhofer, 2002
 Subgenus Pelasmomimus Grundmann, 1955
 Chlaenius australis Dejean, 1831
 Chlaenius greyanus White, 1841
 Subgenus Pleroticus Péringuey, 1896
 Chlaenius buquetii (Dejean & Boisduval, 1830)
 Chlaenius dianus Jedlicka, 1957
 Chlaenius lucidulus (Boheman, 1848)
 Chlaenius schoenherri (Dejean, 1831)
 Chlaenius sumptuosus Alluaud, 1934
 Subgenus Prochlaeniellus Basilewsky, 1965
 Chlaenius boromo Kirschenhofer, 2009
 Chlaenius limbatus Wiedemann, 1821
 Chlaenius limbipennis Boheman, 1860
 Chlaenius marginipennis Gory, 1833
 Chlaenius peringueyi Kuntzen, 1919
 Chlaenius somaliae Basilewsky, 1956
 Chlaenius somereni Alluaud, 1929
 Subgenus Pseudanomoglossus R.T.Bell, 1960
 Chlaenius maxillosus G.Horn, 1876
 Subgenus Pseudochlaeniellus Jeannel, 1949
 Chlaenius caesitius Andrewes, 1923
 Chlaenius celer Chaudoir, 1876
 Chlaenius contractus Chaudoir, 1876
 Chlaenius cribricollis Dejean, 1831
 Chlaenius davidsoni Mandl, 1978
 Chlaenius germanus Chaudoir, 1876
 Chlaenius iranensis Kirschenhofer, 1998
 Chlaenius juvencus Dejean, 1831
 Chlaenius lomsakensis Kirschenhofer, 1998
 Chlaenius lucasii Peyron, 1858
 Chlaenius luteoapicalis Facchini, 2011
 Chlaenius neochloodes Lorenz, 1998
 Chlaenius nigrosuturatus Mandl, 1978
 Chlaenius paenulatus Erichson, 1843
 Chlaenius puncticollis Dejean, 1826
 Chlaenius retropictus Fairmaire, 1901
 Chlaenius rotundatulus Lorenz, 1998
 Chlaenius sobrinus Dejean, 1826
 Chlaenius startellus Basilewsky, 1949
 Chlaenius tenellus Klug, 1832
 Chlaenius togatus Klug, 1829
 Chlaenius waterbergensis Kirschenhofer, 2014
 Subgenus Randallius Bousquet, 2012
 Chlaenius purpuricollis Randall, 1838
 Subgenus Rhopalopalpus LaFerté-Sénectère, 1851
 Chlaenius janthinus Kollar & L.Redtenbacher, 1844
 Subgenus Rhysotrachelus Boheman, 1848
 Chlaenius adametzi Kuntzen, 1913
 Chlaenius conradsi Kuntzen, 1913
 Chlaenius crudelis Péringuey, 1896
 Chlaenius dispreticus (Basilewsky, 1968)
 Chlaenius eryx Kirschenhofer, 2009
 Chlaenius eugrammus Basilewsky, 1947
 Chlaenius exaratus (Basilewsky, 1949)
 Chlaenius garnerae Kirschenhofer, 2016
 Chlaenius immaculatus Péringuey, 1885
 Chlaenius insignis Chaudoir, 1876
 Chlaenius jos Kirschenhofer, 2009
 Chlaenius mediornatus (Basilewsky, 1956)
 Chlaenius nakuruensis Kirschenhofer, 2012
 Chlaenius nepalensis Hope, 1831
 Chlaenius nyassaensis Jedlicka, 1957
 Chlaenius parepus Jedlicka, 1957
 Chlaenius patricius Harold, 1879
 Chlaenius paulyi Kirschenhofer, 2009
 Chlaenius paykulli Crotch, 1871
 Chlaenius quadrimaculatus (Boheman, 1848)
 Chlaenius sangaicus Alluaud, 1929
 Chlaenius savanicola (Basilewsky, 1968)
 Chlaenius teani Gestro, 1881
 Chlaenius tetracelis Alluaud, 1933
 Chlaenius transvaalensis Kirschenhofer, 2009
 Chlaenius vietnami Jedlicka, 1966
 Subgenus Sphodromimus Casale, 1984
 Chlaenius burmanensis (Lassalle, 2001)
 Chlaenius deuvei (Morvan, 1997)
 Chlaenius donabaueri Zettel, 2020
 Chlaenius flavofemoratus Laporte, 1834
 Chlaenius hajeki (Kirschenhofer, 2012)
 Chlaenius holzschuhi (Casale, 1984)
 Chlaenius hunanus (Morvan, 1997)
 Chlaenius laosensis (Kirschenhofer, 2012)
 Chlaenius luzoensis (Brunk, 2015)
 Chlaenius peterseni (Louwerens, 1967)
 Chlaenius pilosus (Casale, 1984)
 Chlaenius tamdaoensis Kirschenhofer, 2003
 Chlaenius thailandensis (Morvan, 1992)
 Chlaenius wrasei (Kirschenhofer, 2003)
 Subgenus Stenochlaenius Reitter, 1908
 Chlaenius coeruleus (Steven, 1809)
 Chlaenius dostojevskii Tschitscherine, 1896
 Chlaenius jaechi (Kirschenhofer, 1991)
 Chlaenius kashmiricus (Grundmann, 1955)
 Chlaenius lederi Reitter, 1888
 Subgenus Terraleus Fairmaire, 1899
 Chlaenius brevior (Fairmaire, 1901)
 Chlaenius perrieri (Fairmaire, 1899)
 Subgenus Tomochilus LaFerté-Sénectère, 1851
 Chlaenius adagidensis Sternberg, 1908
 Chlaenius alternans (Imhoff, 1843)
 Chlaenius carbonatus Chaudoir, 1876
 Chlaenius cupreocinctus Reiche, 1850
 Chlaenius incognitus Kirschenhofer, 2009
 Chlaenius kulti Basilewsky, 1949
 Chlaenius palpalis LaFerté-Sénectère, 1851
 Chlaenius pseudopalpalis Basilewsky, 1949
 Chlaenius siffointei (Basilewsky, 1968)
 Chlaenius trichrous Alluaud, 1918
 Subgenus Trichochlaenius Seidlitz, 1887
 Chlaenius aeneocephalus Dejean, 1826
 Chlaenius aeratus (Quensel, 1806)
 Chlaenius albissoni Reitter, 1908
 Chlaenius basilimbatus (Grundmann, 1956)
 Chlaenius chrysocephalus (P.Rossi, 1790)
 Chlaenius cyaneus Brullé, 1835
 Chlaenius dilutipes Reitter in F.Hauser, 1894
 Chlaenius gotschii Chaudoir, 1846
 Chlaenius infantulus Chaudoir, 1876
 Chlaenius jakeschi Jedlicka, 1967
 Chlaenius milleti Antoine, 1932
 Chlaenius montanus Lucas, 1859
 Chlaenius nebrioides (Antoine, 1961)
 Chlaenius stevenii (Quensel, 1806)
 Chlaenius virens Rambur, 1837
 Subgenus Turanochlaenius Lutshnik, 1933
 Chlaenius semicyaneus Solsky, 1874
 Not assigned to subgenus
 Chlaenius aberrans Bates, 1882
 Chlaenius amplians Bates, 1891
 Chlaenius analis (Olivier, 1795)
 Chlaenius annulipes Bates, 1892
 Chlaenius beatus Bates, 1891
 Chlaenius betioky Kirschenhofer, 2015
 Chlaenius bicolor Chaudoir, 1876
 Chlaenius bottegoi Alluaud, 1933
 Chlaenius cinctus (Fabricius, 1781)
 Chlaenius corrosulus Bates, 1892
 Chlaenius crenistriatus Chaudoir, 1876
 Chlaenius doriae Chaudoir, 1876
 Chlaenius gabonicus Gemminger & Harold, 1868
 Chlaenius gemmingeri Ballion, 1869
 Chlaenius gonospilus Walker, 1871
 Chlaenius greensladei Darlington, 1971
 Chlaenius guineensis Kolbe, 1883
 Chlaenius infersus Péringuey, 1926
 Chlaenius instabilis Raffray, 1886
 Chlaenius luteicauda Chaudoir, 1876
 Chlaenius maleci Kirschenhofer, 2013
 Chlaenius manowianus Jedlicka, 1957
 Chlaenius marianensis Darlington, 1970
 Chlaenius neocaledonicus Chaudoir, 1883
 Chlaenius oberthueri Sternberg, 1908
 Chlaenius obliquatus Barker, 1922
 Chlaenius occultus Sloane, 1907
 Chlaenius ochroperas Bates, 1892
 Chlaenius pacholatkoi Kirschenhofer, 2003
 Chlaenius poecilinus Bates, 1892
 Chlaenius privatus Bates, 1892
 Chlaenius pterostichoides Andrewes, 1941
 Chlaenius pugni Camerano, 1879
 Chlaenius rufithorax Wiedemann, 1821
 Chlaenius samoensis Csiki, 1915
 Chlaenius specularis Emden, 1937
 Chlaenius timorensis Darlington, 1971
 Chlaenius titschacki Jedlicka, 1946
 Chlaenius trigonotomoides Emden, 1928
 Chlaenius victor Andrewes, 1928
 Chlaenius viridanus Jedlicka, 1952
 Chlaenius wallacei Chaudoir, 1876
 Chlaenius yamdena Kirschenhofer, 2011
 †Chlaenius electrinus Giebel, 1862
 †Chlaenius furvus Zhang: Liu & Shangguan, 1989
 †Chlaenius plicatipennis Wickham, 1917
 †Chlaenius punctulatus G.Horn, 1876
 †Chlaenius solitarius Deichmüller, 1886

References

Chlaenius